

Events

Pre-1600
46 BC – Julius Caesar dedicates a temple to Venus Genetrix, fulfilling a vow he made at the Battle of Pharsalus.
 715 – Ragenfrid defeats Theudoald at the Battle of Compiègne.
1087 – William II is crowned King of England, and reigns until 1100.
1212 – The Golden Bull of Sicily is issued to confirm the hereditary royal title in Bohemia for the Přemyslid dynasty.
1345 – Friso-Hollandic Wars: Frisians defeat Holland in the Battle of Warns.
1371 – Serbian–Turkish wars: Ottoman Turks fought against a Serbian army at the Battle of Maritsa.
1423 – Hundred Years' War: A French army defeats the English at the Battle of La Brossinière.
1493 – Pope Alexander VI issues the papal bull Dudum siquidem to the Spanish, extending the grant of new lands he made them in Inter caetera.
1580 – Francis Drake finishes his circumnavigation of the Earth in Plymouth, England.

1601–1900
1687 – Morean War: The Parthenon in Athens, used as a gunpowder depot by the Ottoman garrison, is partially destroyed after being bombarded during the Siege of the Acropolis by Venetian forces.
1688 – The city council of Amsterdam votes to support William of Orange's invasion of England, which became the Glorious Revolution.
1777 – American Revolution: British troops occupy Philadelphia.
1789 – George Washington appoints Thomas Jefferson the first United States Secretary of State.
1799 – War of the 2nd Coalition: French troops defeat Austro-Russian forces, leading to the collapse of Suvorov's campaign. 
1810 – A new Act of Succession is adopted by the Riksdag of the Estates, and Jean Baptiste Bernadotte becomes heir to the Swedish throne.

1901–present
1905 – Albert Einstein publishes the third of his Annus Mirabilis papers, introducing the special theory of relativity.
1907 – Four months after the 1907 Imperial Conference, New Zealand and Newfoundland are promoted from colonies to dominions within the British Empire.
1910 – Indian journalist Swadeshabhimani Ramakrishna Pillai is arrested after publishing criticism of the government of Travancore and is exiled.
1914 – The United States Federal Trade Commission is established by the Federal Trade Commission Act.
1917 – World War I: The Battle of Polygon Wood begins.
1918 – World War I: The Meuse-Argonne Offensive began which would last until the total surrender of German forces.
1923 – The German government accepts the occupation of the Ruhr.
1933 – As gangster Machine Gun Kelly surrenders to the FBI, he shouts out, "Don't shoot, G-Men!", which becomes a nickname for FBI agents.
1934 – The ocean liner  is launched.
1936 – Spanish Civil War: Lluis Companys reshuffles the Generalitat de Catalunya, with the marxist POUM and anarcho-syndicalist CNT joining the government.
1942 – Holocaust: Senior SS official August Frank issues a memorandum detailing how Jews should be "evacuated".
1950 – Korean War: United Nations troops recapture Seoul from North Korean forces.
1953 – Rationing of sugar in the United Kingdom ends
1954 – The Japanese rail ferry Tōya Maru sinks during a typhoon in the Tsugaru Strait, Japan, killing 1,172.
1959 – Typhoon Vera, the strongest typhoon to hit Japan in recorded history, makes landfall, killing 4,580 people and leaving nearly 1.6 million others homeless.
1960 – In Chicago, the first televised debate takes place between presidential candidates Richard M. Nixon and John F. Kennedy.
1969 – Abbey Road, the last recorded album by the Beatles, is released.
1973 – Concorde makes its first non-stop crossing of the Atlantic in record-breaking time.
1980 – At the Oktoberfest terror attack in Munich 13 people die and 211 are injured.
1981 – Nolan Ryan sets a Major League record by throwing his fifth no-hitter.
1983 – Soviet Air Force officer Stanislav Petrov identifies a report of an incoming nuclear missile as a computer error and not an American first strike.
  1983   – Australia II wins the America's Cup, ending the New York Yacht Club's 132-year domination of the race.
1984 – The United Kingdom and China agree to a transfer of sovereignty over Hong Kong, to take place in 1997.
1997 – A Garuda Indonesia Airbus A300 crashes near Medan airport, killing 234.
  1997   – An earthquake strikes the Italian regions of Umbria and the Marche, causing part of the Basilica of St. Francis at Assisi to collapse.
2000 – Anti-globalization protests in Prague (some 20,000 protesters) turn violent during the IMF and World Bank summits.
  2000   – The  sinks off Paros in the Aegean Sea killing 80 passengers.
2002 – The overcrowded Senegalese ferry, capsizes off the coast of the Gambia killing more than 1,000.
2005 – The PBS Kids Channel is shut down and replaced by a joint network with Comcast called Sprout.
2008 – Swiss pilot and inventor Yves Rossy becomes first person to fly a jet engine-powered wing across the English Channel.
2009 – Typhoon Ketsana hits the Philippines, China, Vietnam, Cambodia, Laos and Thailand, causing 700 fatalities.
2010 – The Philippine Bar exam bombing occurred near the De La Salle University in Taft Avenue, Manila injuring 47 people.
2014 – A mass kidnapping occurs in Iguala, Mexico.

Births

Pre-1600
 932 – Al-Mu'izz li-Din Allah, Arab caliph (d. 975)
1329 – Anne of Bavaria, German queen consort (d. 1353)
1406 – Thomas de Ros, 8th Baron de Ros, English soldier and politician (d. 1430)
1462 – Engelbert, Count of Nevers, younger son of John I, Duke of Cleves (d. 1506)
1526 – Wolfgang, Count Palatine of Zweibrücken (d. 1569)

1601–1900
1637 – Sébastien Leclerc, French painter (d. 1714)
1641 – Nehemiah Grew, English plant anatomist and physiologist (d. 1712)
1651 – Francis Daniel Pastorius, founder of Germantown, Philadelphia (d. 1720)
1660 – George William, Duke of Liegnitz (d. 1675)
1698 – William Cavendish, 3rd Duke of Devonshire (d. 1755)
1711 – Richard Grenville-Temple, 2nd Earl Temple, English politician, First Lord of the Admiralty (d. 1779)
1750 – Cuthbert Collingwood, 1st Baron Collingwood, English admiral (d. 1810)
1758 – Cosme Argerich, Argentinian physician (d. 1820)
1767 – Wenzel Müller, Austrian composer and conductor (d. 1835)
1774 – Johnny Appleseed, American gardener and environmentalist (d. 1845)
1783 – Richard Griffin, 3rd Baron Braybrooke, English politician and literary figure (d. 1858)
1791 – Théodore Géricault, French painter and lithographer (d. 1824)
1792 – William Hobson, Irish-New Zealand explorer and politician, 1st Governor of New Zealand (d. 1842)
1820 – Ishwar Chandra Vidyasagar, Indian philosopher, painter, and academic (d. 1891)
1840 – Louis-Olivier Taillon, Canadian lawyer and politician, 8th Premier of Quebec (d. 1923)
1843 – Joseph Furphy, Australian author and poet (d. 1912)
1848 – Henry Walters, American art collector and philanthropist (d. 1931)
1849 – Ivan Pavlov, Russian physiologist and physician, Nobel Prize laureate (d. 1936)
1865 – Archibald Butt, United States Army Officer (d. 1912)
  1865   – Mary Russell, Duchess of Bedford (d. 1937)
1869 – Komitas, Armenian-French priest and composer (d. 1935)
1870 – Christian X of Denmark (d. 1947)
1872 – Max Ehrmann, American poet and lawyer (d. 1945)
1873 – Wacław Berent, Polish author and translator (d. 1940)
1874 – Lewis Hine, American photographer and activist (d. 1940)
1875 – Edmund Gwenn, English-American actor (d. 1959)
1876 – Edith Abbott, American economist, social worker, and author (d. 1957)
  1876   – Ghulam Bhik Nairang, Indian poet, lawyer, and politician (d. 1952)
1877 – Ugo Cerletti, Italian neurologist and academic (d. 1963)
  1877   – Alfred Cortot, Swiss pianist and conductor (d. 1962)
  1877   – Bertha De Vriese, Belgian physician (d. 1958)
1878 – Walter Steinbeck, German actor (d. 1942)
1884 – Jack Bickell, Canadian businessman and philanthropist (d. 1951)
1886 – Archibald Hill, English physiologist, academic, and politician, Nobel Prize laureate (d. 1977)
1887 – Edwin Keppel Bennett, English author and poet (d. 1958)
  1887   – Antonio Moreno, Spanish-American actor and director (d. 1967)
  1887   – Barnes Wallis, English scientist and engineer, invented the Bouncing bomb (d. 1979)
1888 – J. Frank Dobie, American journalist and author (d. 1964)
  1888   – T. S. Eliot, English poet, playwright, critic, Nobel Prize laureate (d. 1965)
1889 – Gordon Brewster, Irish cartoonist (d. 1946)
  1889   – Martin Heidegger, German philosopher and academic (d. 1976)
1890 – Jack Tresadern, English footballer and manager (d. 1959)
1891 – William McKell, Australian politician, 12th Governor General of Australia (d. 1985)
  1891   – Charles Münch, French violinist and conductor (d. 1968)
  1891   – Hans Reichenbach, German philosopher from the Vienna Circle (d. 1953)
1892 – Robert Staughton Lynd, American sociologist and academic (d. 1970)
1894 – Gladys Brockwell, American actress (d. 1929)
  1895   – Jürgen Stroop, German general (d. 1952)
1897 – Pope Paul VI (d. 1978)
  1897   – Arthur Rhys-Davids, English lieutenant and pilot (d. 1917)
1898 – George Gershwin, American pianist and composer (d. 1937)
1900 – Suzanne Belperron, French jewelry designer (d. 1983)

1901–present
1901 – George Raft, American actor, singer, and dancer (d. 1980)
  1901   – Ted Weems, American bandleader and musician (d. 1963)
1905 – Millito Navarro, Puerto Rican baseball player (d. 2011)
  1905   – Karl Rappan, Austrian footballer and coach (d. 1996)
1907 – Anthony Blunt, English historian and spy (d. 1983)
  1907   – Shug Fisher, American singer-songwriter, musician, actor, and comedian (d. 1984)
  1907   – Bep van Klaveren, Dutch boxer (d. 1992)
1909 – Bill France, Sr., American race car driver, founded NASCAR (d. 1992)
  1909   – A. P. Hamann, American lieutenant, lawyer, and politician (d. 1977)
1911 – Al Helfer, American sportscaster (d. 1975)
1913 – Frank Brimsek, American ice hockey player (d. 1998)
1914 – Achille Compagnoni, Italian skier and mountaineer (d. 2009)
  1914   – Jack LaLanne, American fitness expert (d. 2011)
1917 – Réal Caouette, Canadian journalist and politician (d. 1976)
  1917   – Tran Duc Thao, Vietnamese-French philosopher and theorist (d. 1993)
1918 – Eric Morley, English businessman and television host, founded the Miss World (d. 2000)
1919 – Barbara Britton, American actress (d. 1980)
  1919   – Matilde Camus, Spanish poet and author (d. 2012)
1922 – Takis Miliadis, Greek actor (d. 1985)
  1922   – Nicholas Romanov, Prince of Russia (d. 2014)
1923 – Dev Anand, Indian actor, director, producer, and screenwriter (d. 2011)
  1923   – Hugh Griffiths, Baron Griffiths, English cricketer, lawyer, and judge (d. 2015)
  1923   – James Hennessy, English businessman and diplomat
1924 – Jean Hoerni, Swiss physicist, inventor and businessman (d. 1997)
1925 – Norm Dussault, American-Canadian ice hockey player (d. 2012)
  1925   – Marty Robbins, American singer-songwriter, guitarist, actor, and race car driver (d. 1982)
1926 – Julie London, American singer and actress (d. 2000)
  1926   – Manfred Mayrhofer, Austrian philologist and academic (d. 2011)
1927 – Robert Cade, American physician and educator, co-invented Gatorade (d. 2007)
  1927   – Patrick O'Neal, American actor (d. 1994)
  1927   – Enzo Bearzot, Italian footballer and manager (d. 2010)
1928 – Bob Van der Veken, Belgian actor (d. 2019)
  1928   – Wilford White, American football player (d. 2013)
1930 – Philip Bosco, American actor (d. 2018)
  1930   – Joe Brown, English mountaineer and author (d. 2020)
1931 – Kenneth Parnell, American sex offender (d. 2008)
1932 – Manmohan Singh, Indian economist and politician, 13th Prime Minister of India
1932 – Donna Douglas, American actress (d. 2015)
  1932   – Joyce Jameson, American actress (d. 1987)
  1932   – Vladimir Voinovich, Russian author and poet (d. 2018)
1934 – Neil Coles, English golfer and architect
1935 – Bob Barber, English cricketer 
  1935   – Lou Myers, American actor (d. 2013)
  1935   – Joe Sherlock, Irish politician (d. 2007)
1936 – Leroy Drumm, American sailor and songwriter (d. 2010)
  1936   – Winnie Madikizela-Mandela, South African academic and politician, 8th First Lady of South Africa (d. 2018)
1937 – Valentin Pavlov, Russian banker and politician, 11th Premier of the Soviet Union (d. 2003)
  1937   – Jerry Weintraub, American film producer and agent (d. 2015)
1938 – Lucette Aldous, New Zealand-Australian ballerina and educator
  1938   – Jonathan Goldsmith, American actor
  1938   – Lars-Jacob Krogh, Norwegian journalist (d. 2010)
1939 – Ricky Tomlinson, English actor and screenwriter
1941 – Salvatore Accardo, Italian violinist and conductor
  1941   – Martine Beswick, Jamaican-English model and actress
  1941   – David Frizzell, American country music singer-songwriter and guitarist
1942 – Kent McCord, American actor
  1942   – Gloria E. Anzaldúa, American scholar of Chicana cultural theory (d. 2004)
1943 – Ian Chappell, Australian cricketer and sportscaster
  1943   – Tim Schenken, Australian race car driver
1944 – Jan Brewer, American politician, 22nd Governor of Arizona
  1944   – Keith O'Nions, English geologist and academic
  1944   – Anne Robinson, English journalist and game show host
1945 – Louise Beaudoin, Canadian academic and politician
  1945   – Gal Costa, Brazilian singer (d. 2022)
  1945   – Bryan Ferry, English singer-songwriter 
1946 – Andrea Dworkin, American activist and author (d. 2005)
  1946   – John MacLachlan Gray, Canadian actor, playwright, and composer
  1946   – Radha Krishna Mainali, Nepalese politician
  1946   – Louise Simonson, American author
  1946   – Claudette Werleigh, Haitian Prime Minister
1947 – Lynn Anderson, American singer and actress (d. 2015)
  1947   – Philippe Lavil, French singer and actor
  1947   – Dick Roth, American swimmer
1948 – Olivia Newton-John, English-Australian singer-songwriter and actress (d. 2022)
  1948   – Vladimír Remek, Czech politician, diplomat, cosmonaut and military pilot
1949 – Clodoaldo, Brazilian footballer and manager
  1949   – Wendy Saddington, Australian singer and journalist (d. 2013)
  1949   – Jane Smiley, American novelist
  1949   – Minette Walters, English journalist and author
1950 – Andy Haden, New Zealand rugby player (d. 2020)
1951 – Tommy Taylor, English footballer and manager
  1951   – Stuart Tosh, Scottish singer-songwriter and drummer 
1953 – Dolores Keane, Irish singer and actress 
  1953   – Douglas A. Melton, American biologist and academic
  1953   – Paul Stephenson, English police officer
1954 – Craig Chaquico, American guitarist 
  1954   – Kevin Kennedy, American baseball player, manager, and sportscaster
  1954   – Cesar Rosas, Mexican-American singer-songwriter and guitarist
1956 – Steve Butler, American race car driver and engineer
  1956   – Linda Hamilton, American actress
1957 – Bob Staake, American author and illustrator
  1957   – Klaus Augenthaler, German footballer and manager
  1957   – Michael Dweck, American photographer and director
1958 – Rudi Cerne, German figure skater and journalist
  1958   – Darby Crash, American singer-songwriter (d. 1980)
  1958   – Robert Kagan, Greek-American historian and author
  1958   – Kenny Sansom, English footballer
  1958   – Richard B. Weldon Jr., American sailor and politician
1959 – Andrew Bolt, Australian journalist
  1959   – Trevor Dodds, Namibian golfer
  1959   – Rich Gedman, American baseball player and coach
  1959   – Ilya Kormiltsev, Russian poet and translator (d. 2007)
1960 – Uwe Bein, German footballer and manager
  1960   – Jouke de Vries, Dutch academic and politician
  1960   – Doug Supernaw, American country music singer-songwriter and guitarist (d. 2020)
1961 – Jeanie Buss, American sports executive
  1961   – Cindy Herron, American singer-songwriter and actress 
  1961   – Marianne Mikko, Estonian journalist and politician
  1961   – Will Self, English novelist and journalist 
1962 – Melissa Sue Anderson, American-Canadian actress
  1962   – Peter Foster, Australian criminal
  1962   – Mark Haddon, English author and poet
  1962   – Steve Moneghetti, Australian runner
  1962   – Al Pitrelli, American guitarist and songwriter
  1962   – Tracey Thorn, English singer-songwriter and writer 
  1962   – Jacky Wu, Taiwanese singer, actor, and television host
1963 – Lysette Anthony, English actress and producer
  1963   – Joe Nemechek, American race car driver
1964 – Nicki French, English singer and actress
  1964   – Dave Martinez, American baseball player and coach
  1964   – John Tempesta, American drummer 
1965 – Radisav Ćurčić, Serbian-Israeli basketball player
  1965   – Petro Poroshenko, Ukrainian businessman and politician, 5th President of Ukraine
1966 – Christos Dantis, Greek singer-songwriter and producer
  1966   – Shane Dye, New Zealand jockey
  1966   – Craig Heyward, American football player (d. 2006)
  1966   – Jillian Barberie, Canadian actress and sportscaster
1967 – Bruno Akrapović, Bosnian footballer and manager
  1967   – Shannon Hoon, American singer-songwriter and guitarist (d. 1995)
  1967   – Craig Janney, American ice hockey player
1968 – Jim Caviezel, American actor
1969 – Andy Petterson, Australian footballer and coach
  1969   – David Slade, English director and producer
  1969   – Holger Stanislawski, German footballer and manager
  1969   – Paul Warhurst, English footballer and manager
1970 – Daryl Beattie, Australian motorcycle racer
  1970   – Sheri Moon Zombie, American actress and fashion designer
  1970   – David Parland, Swedish guitarist (d. 2013)
1972 – Ras Kass, American rapper and producer 
  1972   – Beto O'Rourke, American politician
  1972   – Shawn Stockman, American singer 
1973 – Marty Casey, American singer-songwriter and guitarist
  1973   – Julienne Davis, American actress, producer, and screenwriter
  1973   – Chris Small, Scottish snooker player and coach
  1973   – Olga Vasdeki, Greek triple jumper
1974 – Boris Cepeda, German-Ecuadorian pianist and diplomat
  1974   – Gary Hall Jr., American swimmer
  1974   – Martin Müürsepp, Estonian basketball player and coach
1975 – Emma Härdelin, Swedish singer and violinist 
  1975   – Jake Paltrow, American director and screenwriter
  1975   – Chiara Schoras, German actress
1976 – Michael Ballack, German footballer
  1976   – Sami Vänskä, Finnish bass player 
1977 – Kerem Özyeğen, Turkish singer-songwriter and guitarist 
  1977   – Aka Plu, Japanese comedian and actor
1978 – Robert Kipkoech Cheruiyot, Kenyan runner
1979 – Jon Harley, English footballer
  1979   – Simon Kirch, German sprinter
  1979   – Naomichi Marufuji, Japanese wrestler
  1979   – Fuifui Moimoi, Tongan-New Zealand rugby league player
  1979   – Cameron Mooney, Australian footballer
  1979   – Jaycie Phelps, American gymnast
  1979   – Taavi Rõivas, Estonian politician, 16th Prime Minister of Estonia
  1979   – Jacob Tierney, Canadian actor, director, and screenwriter
1980 – Patrick Friesacher, Austrian race car driver
  1980   – Brooks Orpik, American ice hockey player
  1980   – Daniel Sedin, Swedish ice hockey player
  1980   – Henrik Sedin, Swedish ice hockey player
1981 – Yao Beina, Chinese singer (d. 2015)
  1981   – Christina Milian, American singer-songwriter, dancer, and actress
  1981   – Ayumi Tsunematsu, Japanese voice actress
  1981   – Kanako Urai, Japanese professional wrestler
  1981   – Serena Williams, American tennis player
1982 – Rob Burrow, English rugby player
 1982    – Simon Picone, Italian rugby player
 1982    – John Scott, Canadian ice hockey player
  1982   – Miguel Alfredo Portillo, Argentinian footballer
  1982   – Jon Richardson, English comedian and radio host
1983 – D'Qwell Jackson, American football player
  1983   – Archimede Morleo, Italian footballer
  1983   – Ricardo Quaresma, Portuguese footballer
1984 – Nev Schulman, American photographer, television host, and producer
1986 – Sean Doolittle, American baseball player
1987 – Rosanna Munter, Swedish singer-songwriter
  1987   – Vladimir Niculescu, Romanian professional football player 
  1987   – Cyril Gautier, French road bicycle racer
1988 – James Blake, English singer-songwriter and producer
  1988   – Kiira Korpi, Finnish figure skater
1989 – Chinami Suzuki, Japanese model, television host, and actress
  1989   – Jonny Bairstow, English and Yorkshire Wicketkeeper/Batsman
1991 – Dan Preston, English footballer
  1991   – Alma Jodorowsky, French actress, fashion model and singer
  1991   – Réka Demeter, Hungarian football defender
1992 – Yoo Ara, South Korean singer and actress
1993 – Michael Kidd-Gilchrist, American basketball player
1994 – Lucas Gafarot, Spanish footballer
  1994   – Jack Conger, American swimmer
1995 – Miloš Veljković, Serbian footballer
1996 – Jessika Ponchet, French tennis player
2000 – Princess Salma bint Abdullah, Jordanian princess
  2000   – Frankie Amaya, American soccer player
2001 – Xinyu Wang, Chinese tennis player

Deaths

Pre-1600
 800 – Berowulf, bishop of Würzburg
 862 – Musa ibn Musa al-Qasawi, Muslim military leader (b. c. 790)
1241 – Fujiwara no Teika, Japanese poet
1290 – Margaret, Maid of Norway Queen of Scotland (b. 1283)
1313 – Gottfried von Hagenau, Alsatian theologian, medical doctor, and poet
1327 – Cecco d'Ascoli, Italian encyclopaedist, physician and poet (b. 1257)
1328 – Ibn Taymiya, Islamic scholar and philosopher of Harran (b. 1263)
1345 – William II, Count of Hainaut
1371 – Jovan Uglješa, Serbian despot
1413 – Stephen III, Duke of Bavaria (b. 1337)
1417 – Francesco Zabarella, Italian cardinal (b. 1360)
1468 – Juan de Torquemada, Spanish cardinal and theologian (b. 1388)
1536 – Didier de Saint-Jaille, 46th Grandmaster of the Knights Hospitaller
1588 – Amias Paulet, Governor of Jersey (b. 1532)
1600 – Claude Le Jeune, French composer (b. 1530)

1601–1900
1620 – Taichang Emperor of China (b. 1582)
1623 – Charles Grey, 7th Earl of Kent, English politician, Lord Lieutenant of Bedfordshire (b. 1540)
1626 – Wakisaka Yasuharu, Japanese daimyō (b. 1554)
1716 – Antoine Parent, French mathematician and theorist (b. 1666)
1764 – Benito Jerónimo Feijóo y Montenegro, Spanish monk and scholar (b. 1676)
1800 – William Billings, American composer and educator (b. 1746)
1802 – Jurij Vega, Slovene mathematician and physicist (b. 1754)
1820 – Daniel Boone, American hunter and explorer (b. 1734)
1846 – Thomas Clarkson, English abolitionist (b. 1760)
1868 – August Ferdinand Möbius, German mathematician and astronomer (b. 1790)
1877 – Hermann Grassmann, German mathematician and physicist (b. 1809)

1901–present
1902 – Levi Strauss, German-American businessman, founded Levi Strauss & Co. (b. 1829)
1904 – Lafcadio Hearn, Greek-Japanese author and academic (b. 1850)
  1904   – John Fitzwilliam Stairs, Canadian businessman and politician (b. 1848)
1922 – Charles Wade, Australian politician, 17th Premier of New South Wales (b. 1863)
1935 – Andy Adams, American author (b. 1859)
  1935   – Iván Persa, Slovene-Hungarian priest and author (b. 1861)
1937 – Bessie Smith, American singer and actress (b. 1894)
1943 – Henri Fertet, French Resistance fighter (b. 1926) 
1945 – Béla Bartók, Hungarian pianist and composer (b. 1881)
1946 – William Strunk Jr., American author and educator (b. 1869)
1947 – Hugh Lofting, English-American author and poet (b. 1886)
1951 – Hans Cloos, German geologist and academic (b. 1885)
1952 – George Santayana, Spanish philosopher, novelist, and poet (b. 1863)
1953 – Xu Beihong, Chinese painter and educator (b. 1895)
1954 – Ellen Roosevelt, American tennis player (b. 1868)
1957 – Arthur Powell Davies, American minister and author (b. 1902)
1959 – S. W. R. D. Bandaranaike, Sri Lankan lawyer and politician, 4th Prime Minister of Sri Lanka (b. 1899)
  1959   – Leslie Morshead, Australian general (b. 1889)
  1959   – Teodor Ussisoo, Estonian furniture designer and educator (b. 1878)
1965 – James Fitzmaurice, Irish soldier and pilot (b. 1898)
1968 – Ben Shlomo Lipman-Heilprin, Polish-Israeli neurologist and physician (b. 1902)
  1968   – Daniel Johnson Sr., Canadian lawyer and politician, 20th Premier of Quebec (b. 1915)
  1968   – Władysław Kędra, Polish pianist (b. 1918)
1972 – Charles Correll, American actor and screenwriter (b. 1890)
1973 – Samuel Flagg Bemis, American historian and author (b. 1891)
  1973   – Ralph Earnhardt, American race car driver (b. 1928)
  1973   – Anna Magnani, Italian actress and singer (b. 1908)
1976 – Leopold Ružička, Croatian-Swiss chemist and academic, Nobel Prize laureate (b. 1887)
1977 – Uday Shankar, Indian dancer and choreographer (b. 1900)
1978 – Manne Siegbahn, Swedish physicist and academic, Nobel Prize laureate (b. 1886)
1979 – Arthur Hunnicutt, American actor (b. 1910)
1982 – Alec Hurwood, Australian cricketer (b. 1902)
1984 – Paquirri, Spanish bullfighter (b. 1948)
  1984   – John Facenda, American sportscaster (b. 1913)
1987 – Ramang, Indonesian footballer and manager (b. 1928)
  1987   – Herbert Tichy, Austrian geologist, journalist, and mountaineer (b. 1912)
1988 – Branko Zebec, Yugoslav football player and coach (b. 1929)
1989 – Hemanta Kumar Mukhopadhyay, Indian singer-songwriter and producer (b. 1920)
1990 – Hiram Abas, Turkish intelligence officer (b. 1932)
  1990   – Alberto Moravia, Italian author and critic (b. 1907)
1991 – Billy Vaughn, American singer and bandleader (b. 1919)
1995 – Kalju Pitksaar, Estonian chess player (b. 1931)
1996 – Nicu Ceaușescu, Romanian politician (b. 1951)
1997 – Dorothy Kingsley, American screenwriter and producer (b. 1909)
1998 – Betty Carter, American singer (b. 1930)
1999 – Oseola McCarty, American philanthropist (b. 1908)
2000 – Richard Mulligan, American actor (b. 1932)
  2000   – Baden Powell de Aquino, Brazilian guitarist and composer (b. 1937)
2003 – Shawn Lane, American guitarist, songwriter, and producer (b. 1963)
  2003   – Robert Palmer, English singer-songwriter (b. 1949)
2004 – Marianna Komlos, Canadian bodybuilder, model, and wrestler (b. 1969)
2005 – Helen Cresswell, English author and screenwriter (b. 1934)
2006 – Byron Nelson, American golfer and coach (b. 1912)
  2006   – Iva Toguri D'Aquino, American wartime propaganda broadcaster (b. 1916)
2007 – Bill Wirtz, American businessman (b. 1929)
2008 – Marc Moulin, Belgian keyboard player, producer, and journalist (b. 1942)
  2008   – Paul Newman, American actor, director, producer, and businessman (b. 1925)
2010 – Terry Newton, English rugby player (b. 1978)
  2010   – Gloria Stuart, American actress (b. 1910)
2011 – Bob Cassilly, American sculptor, founded the City Museum (b. 1949)
2012 – M'el Dowd, American actress and singer (b. 1933)
  2012   – Sylvia Fedoruk, Canadian physicist and politician, 17th Lieutenant Governor of Saskatchewan (b. 1927)
  2012   – Eugene Genovese, American historian and author (b. 1930)
  2012   – Sam Steiger, American journalist and politician (b. 1929)
2013 – Azizan Abdul Razak, Malaysian politician, 10th Menteri Besar of Kedah (b. 1944)
  2013   – Seánie Duggan, Irish hurler (b. 1922)
  2013   – Mario Montez, Puerto Rican-American actor (b. 1935)
  2013   – Sos Sargsyan, Armenian actor and director (b. 1929)
2014 – Jim Boeke, American football player and coach (b. 1938)
  2014   – Sam Hall, American screenwriter (b. 1921)
  2014   – Gerald Neugebauer, American astronomer and physicist (b. 1932)
  2014   – Tamir Sapir, Georgian-American businessman (b. 1946)
2015 – Eudóxia Maria Froehlich, Brazilian zoologist (b. 1928)
  2015   – Sidney Phillips, American soldier, physician, and author (b. 1924)
  2015   – Ana Seneviratne, Sri Lankan police officer and diplomat (b. 1927)
2019 – Jacques Chirac, French politician and President of France (b. 1932)

Holidays and observances
 Christian feast days:
 Canadian Martyrs (Catholic Church in Canada)
 Cosmas and Damian
 John of Meda
 Nilus the Younger
 Wilson Carlile (Anglican)
 September 26 (Eastern Orthodox liturgics)
 Day of the National Flag (Ecuador)
 Dominion Day (New Zealand)
 European Day of Languages (European Union)
 National Good Neighbor Day (United States)
 Petrov day
 Revolution Day (Yemen)

References

External links

 
 
 

Days of the year
September